Jesús Sánchez González (born March 23, 1976 in Mexico City) is a Mexican race walker. He set his personal best time of 3:50:55, by finishing thirteenth in the men's 50 km race walk at the 2009 IAAF World Championships in Berlin, Germany.

Sanchez represented Mexico at the 2008 Summer Olympics in Beijing, where he competed for the men's 50 km race walk, along with his teammates Mario Iván Flores and Horacio Nava. He successfully finished the race in eighteenth place by one minute behind China's Si Tianfeng, with a time of 3:53:58.

References

External links

NBC 2008 Olympics profile

Mexican male racewalkers
Living people
Olympic athletes of Mexico
Athletes (track and field) at the 2008 Summer Olympics
Athletes from Mexico City
1976 births
21st-century Mexican people